Riley Green (born October 18, 1988) is an American country music singer/songwriter. He saw his first success with the single "There Was This Girl" in 2018. He released an album, Different 'Round Here, in September 2019.

Born and raised in Jacksonville, Alabama.  His songs reflect the influences of his life growing up in a small town in the South.

Music career

Before he was a recording artist, Green was a Division 1 FCS Quarterback on the  Jacksonville State University football team. Green was also a contestant on the CMT reality show Redneck Island. He released a self-titled EP in 2013, followed by additional EPs in 2015, 2016, and 2017. In 2018, he signed to the Big Machine Label Group.

Billy Dukes of Taste of Country reviewed "There Was This Girl" favorably, comparing its theme to "Chicks Dig It" by Chris Cagle and noting the more neotraditional country influence compared to Green's peers. The song charted on Country Airplay, and a music video was shot in October 2018.

In April 2019, Green announced the release of his second single, "In Love by Now", co-written with Rhett Akins, Ben Hayslip, and Marv Green, and released an accompanying music video shot in Belize.

"I Wish Grandpas Never Died" was released in August 2019 as the third single from Green's debut album, Different 'Round Here, which was released on September 20, 2019.

The Academy of Country Music presented Riley Green with the New Male Artist of the Year Award for 2019.

Discography

Studio albums

Extended plays

Singles

Featured singles

Music videos

References

American country singer-songwriters
American male singer-songwriters
Big Machine Records artists
Living people
Participants in American reality television series
People from Calhoun County, Alabama
Country musicians from Alabama
1988 births
Singer-songwriters from Alabama